Mahram Tehran Basketball Club is an Iranian professional basketball club based in Tehran, Iran. They compete in the Iranian Basketball Super League. Mahram is considered one of the giants of Iranian Basketball and were Champions of Asia in 2009 and 2010. Mahram has won the Iranian Basketball Super League championship a total of six times.

They are owned and sponsored by Mahram Food Company, Which is a recognised food processing company located in Tehran.

History
Mahram was founded in 1999 and is owned by the Mahram Food Company. Mahram won its first Iranian Basketball Super League championship in 2008 and won the next four editions as well, Mahram won its first Asian Champions Cup in 2009 and repeated the feat in 2010. Mahram's streak was broken in 2012 when they finished in second place in the Super League, Mahram won the Iranian Super League for the sixth time in 2015 after a two year absence. Notable national team players such as Hamed Haddadi and Mehdi Kamrani have played for Mahram over the years.

Tournament records

Iranian Super League
 2004–05: 13th place
 2005–06: 11th place
 2006–07: 3rd place
 2007–08: Champions
 2008–09: Champions
 2009–10: Champions
 2010–11: Champions
 2011–12: Champions
 2012–13: 2nd place
 2013–14: 2nd place
 2014–15: Champions
 2017–18: 2nd place
 2019–20: Cancelled
 2020–21: 2nd place

WABA Champions Cup
 2009: Champions
 2010: Champions
 2011: 3rd place
 2012: Champions
 2014: Champions

Asian Champions Cup
 2009: Champions
 2010: Champions
 2011: 2nd place
 2012: 2nd place

ABA Club Championship
 2009: Champions

Dubai International Tournament 
 2007: Champions
 2008: 5th place
 2009: 6th place
 2010: Champions

Coaches
  Hassan Negahdari (2004–2005)
  Mohammad Mehdi Izadpanah (2005–2006)
  Radenko Orlović (2006–2007)
  Mostafa Hashemi (2007–2010)
  Mehran Shahintab (2010–2011)
  Mostafa Hashemi (2011–2012)
  Memi Bečirovič (2012–2013)
  Mostafa Hashemi (2013–2015, 2017–2018, 2019-)

Players

FIBA Hall of Famers

Notable players

Squads
2009 FIBA Asia Champions Cup
Mehrad Atashi, Saman Veisi, Kaveh Nourafza, Mehdi Kamrani, Kaveh Gharieh, Aidin Kabir, Hamed Afagh, Hamed Sohrabnejad, Jackson Vroman, Houman Rezaei, Samad Nikkhah Bahrami, Priest Lauderdale. Coach: Mostafa Hashemi
2010 FIBA Asia Champions Cup
Mehrad Atashi, Jackson Vroman, Kaveh Nourafza, Mehdi Kamrani, Loren Woods, Aidin Kabir, Hamed Afagh, Hamed Sohrabnejad, Mehdi Esmaeili, Mohammad Reza Dargi, Samad Nikkhah Bahrami, Saman Veisi. Coach: Mostafa Hashemi

References

External links
page on Asia-Basket
Official website

Basketball teams in Iran
Sport in Tehran
Basketball teams established in 1999
1999 establishments in Iran